

Predicted and scheduled events

January
Central African Republic presidential election of 2016

February
February 18 - Ugandan general election, 2016
February 21
Comorian presidential election, 2016
Niger presidential election
February 28 - Benin presidential election
Cape Verdean parliamentary election, 2016

March
March 20 - Republic of Congo presidential election

April
April 8 - Djiboutian presidential election, 2016
April 10 - Chadian presidential election, 2016

August
Cape Verdean presidential election, 2016

September
September 20 - Zambian general election, 2016

November
November 7 - Ghanaian general election, 2016
November 27 - Democratic Republic of the Congo general election, 2016

December
Gabonese legislative election, 2016

Unknown date
Moroccan general election, 2016
Next Somali parliamentary election

 
2010s in Africa
Years of the 21st century in Africa